Jaqueline Mourão (born 27 December 1975) is a Brazilian cyclist, biathlete, and cross-country skier. 

Born and raised in the mountainous city of Belo Horizonte, she only began cross-country skiing at the age of 29 and competed in an XC-Ski race for the first time in December 2005. After only ten years of XC-Ski racing, in 2015, she was competitive enough to obtain three podiums in NorAm Cups. 

She participated in five Winter Olympics — Torino (XC-Ski), Vancouver (XC-Ski), Sochi (XC-Ski & Biathlon), Pyeongchang (XC-Ski) and Beijing (XC-Ski) — as well as in three Summer Olympics, Athens (MTB), Beijing (MTB), and Tokyo (MTB). Jaqueline Mourão carried the Brazilian flag during the Closing Ceremony at the 2010 Vancouver Olympics and during the Opening Ceremony at the 2014 Sochi Olympics and the 2022 Beijing Olympics.

Cross-country skiing results
All results are sourced from the International Ski Federation (FIS).

Olympic Games

World Championships

World  Cup

Season standings

References

External links

1975 births
Living people
Brazilian female cross-country skiers
Brazilian female cyclists
Brazilian mountain bikers
Cross-country mountain bikers
Brazilian female biathletes
Cross-country skiers at the 2006 Winter Olympics
Cross-country skiers at the 2010 Winter Olympics
Cross-country skiers at the 2014 Winter Olympics
Cross-country skiers at the 2018 Winter Olympics
Cross-country skiers at the 2022 Winter Olympics
Biathletes at the 2014 Winter Olympics
Cyclists at the 2004 Summer Olympics
Cyclists at the 2008 Summer Olympics
Cyclists at the 2020 Summer Olympics
Olympic cross-country skiers of Brazil
Olympic cyclists of Brazil
Olympic biathletes of Brazil
Sportspeople from Belo Horizonte
Pan American Games medalists in cycling
Pan American Games bronze medalists for Brazil
Cyclists at the 2019 Pan American Games
Medalists at the 2019 Pan American Games